Argentina competed at the 1976 Winter Olympics in Innsbruck, Austria.

Alpine skiing

Men

Cross-country skiing

Men

References
 Official Olympic Reports
 Olympic Winter Games 1976, full results by sports-reference.com

Nations at the 1976 Winter Olympics
1976
1976 in Argentine sport